Josef Čtvrtníček (born 23 February 1990) is a Czech football player who currently plays for Loko Vltavín.

Career
In November 2017, joined Čtvrtníček Slavoj Vyšehrad. After the season, he then joined FK Zbuzany 1953. Čtvrtníček played for the club until 30 June 2019, where he moved to Germany and signed with VfB Auerbach for the rest of the season.

Čtvrtníček joined Slavoj Vyšehrad in August 2017. After spells with FK Zbuzany and German club VfB Auerbach, Čtvrtníček returned to Czech Republic and signed for Loko Vltavín in September 2019.

References

External links
 
 Profile at FC Zbrojovka Brno official site

Czech footballers
Czech expatriate footballers
People from Vyškov
1990 births
Living people
Czech First League players
Czech National Football League players
I liga players
2. Liga (Slovakia) players
Regionalliga players
1. FC Slovácko players
FK Fotbal Třinec players
FK Ústí nad Labem players
FC Zbrojovka Brno players
MFK Vyškov players
SK Líšeň players
Sandecja Nowy Sącz players
FK Dukla Banská Bystrica players
1. SK Prostějov players
FK Slavoj Vyšehrad players
VfB Auerbach players
Loko Vltavín players
Association football forwards
Czech expatriate sportspeople in Poland
Czech expatriate sportspeople in Slovakia
Czech expatriate sportspeople in Germany
Expatriate footballers in Poland
Expatriate footballers in Slovakia
Expatriate footballers in Germany
Sportspeople from the South Moravian Region